Michael J. Telch (born March 28, 1953 in Boston, Massachusetts) is an American psychologist who has taught at the University of Texas at Austin (UT-Austin) since 1986. At UT-Austin, he is a professor of clinical psychology, the founding director of the Laboratory for the Study of Anxiety Disorders (which he founded in 1988), and the former Director of Clinical Training. He is a fellow of the Association for Psychological Science and the American Association of Applied and Preventive Psychology. He is known for his research on posttraumatic stress disorder among American soldiers, and the extent to which it can be predicted before the soldiers serve in combat.

References

External links
Telch's faculty page

Fear Less, an article in Texas Monthly about Telch's research on posttraumatic stress disorder

Living people
University of Texas at Austin faculty
1953 births
University of Massachusetts Amherst alumni
University of the Pacific (United States) alumni
Stanford University alumni
People from Boston
Fellows of the Association for Psychological Science
American clinical psychologists